Snake orchid is a common name for several plants and may refer to:

 Cymbidium suave, of eastern Australia
 Prasophyllum elatum, endemic to Australia
 , from southern Florida to the Caribbean

See also